This page describes the qualification procedure for 1994 FIBA Europe Under-20 Championship.

Qualified teams
Qualified as the host nation:
 

Qualified as the top teams in the previous tournament:
 
 
 

Qualified through the Qualifying Round

Qualification format
The Qualifying Round was held from 14 July to 1 August 1993. There were four groups, one group of five teams and three groups of six teams. The first and second placed team from each group qualified for 1994 FIBA Europe Under-20 Championship. One team of each group hosted the mini-tournament.

Qualifying round

Group A
All the games were played in Helsinki, Finland.

Group B
All the games were played in Nyíregyháza, Hungary.

Group C
All the games were played in Évora, Portugal.

Group D
All the games were played in Bursa, Turkey.

References
FIBA Archive
FIBA Europe Archive

FIBA Europe Under-20 Championship qualification
1993–94 in European basketball
1994 FIBA Europe Under-20 Championship